Pilkhuva is a town in India in Ghaziabad, Uttar Pradesh, 50 kilometres from Delhi.

Location
Pilkhuva lies along state highway AH-2 (Hapur road), and is surrounded by the towns of Partapur, Chajjarasi Khuleechnagar, Khera, Duhri, and Doohri village.

References

Cities and towns in Ghaziabad district, India